is a Japanese weightlifter. He competed in the men's featherweight event at the 1992 Summer Olympics.

References

1970 births
Living people
Japanese male weightlifters
Olympic weightlifters of Japan
Weightlifters at the 1992 Summer Olympics
Place of birth missing (living people)